The 2005 FIBA Europe Under-16 Championship was the 19th edition of the FIBA Europe Under-16 Championship. The city of León, in Spain, hosted the tournament. Turkey won the trophy for the second time. Poland and Belgium were relegated to Division B.

Teams

Preliminary round

Group A

Group B

Group C

Group D

Classification round

Group G

Group H

Quarterfinals round

Group E

Group F

Knockout stage

13th–16th playoffs

Poland and Belgium were relegated to Division B.

9th–12th playoffs

5th–8th playoffs

Championship

Final standings

References
FIBA Archive
FIBA Europe Archive

FIBA U16 European Championship
2005–06 in European basketball
2005–06 in Spanish basketball
International youth basketball competitions hosted by Spain